Eopirga is a genus of moths in the subfamily Lymantriinae. The genus was described by Hering in 1926. Both species are known from Madagascar.

Species
Eopirga candida Hering, 1926
Eopirga heptastica (Mabille, 1878)

References

Lymantriinae
Noctuoidea genera